A library is a collection of materials, books or media that are accessible for use and not just for display purposes. A library provides physical (hard copies) or digital access (soft copies) materials, and may be a physical location or a virtual space, or both. A library's collection can include printed materials and other physical resources in many formats such as DVD, CD and cassette as well as access to information, music or other content held on bibliographic databases.

A library, which may vary widely in size, may be organized for use and maintained by a public body such as a government; an institution such as a school or museum; a corporation; or a private individual. In addition to providing materials, libraries also provide the services of librarians who are trained and experts at finding, selecting, circulating and organizing information and at interpreting information needs, navigating and analyzing very large amounts of information with a variety of resources.

Library buildings often provide quiet areas for studying, as well as common areas for group study and collaboration, and may provide public facilities for access to their electronic resources; for instance: computers and access to the Internet. The library's clientele and services offered vary depending on its type: users of a public library have different needs from those of a special library or academic library, for example. Libraries may also be community hubs, where programs are delivered and people engage in lifelong learning. Modern libraries extend their services beyond the physical walls of a building by providing material accessible by electronic means, including from home via the Internet.

The services that libraries offer are variously described as library services, information services, or the combination "library and information services", although different institutions and sources define such terminology differently.

Etymology
The term library is based on the Latin word  for 'book' or 'document', contained in Latin  'collection of books' and  'container for books'. Other modern languages use derivations from Ancient Greek , originally meaning 'book container', via Latin  (cf. French  or German ).

History

The history of libraries began with the first efforts to organize collections of documents. The first libraries consisted of archives of the earliest form of writing—the clay tablets in cuneiform script discovered in Sumer, some dating back to 2600 BC. Private or personal libraries made up of written books appeared in classical Greece in the 5th century BC. In the 6th century, at the very close of the Classical period, the great libraries of the Mediterranean world remained those of Constantinople and Alexandria.

The Fatimids (r. 909–1171) also possessed many great libraries within their domains. The historian Ibn Abi Tayyi’ describes their palace library, which probably contained the largest collection of literature on earth at the time, as a "wonder of the world". Throughout history, along with bloody massacres, the destruction of libraries has been critical for conquerors who wish to destroy every trace of the vanquished community's recorded memory. A prominent example of this can be found in the Mongol massacre of the Nizaris at Alamut in 1256 and the torching of their library, "the fame of which", boasts the conqueror Juwayni, "had spread throughout the world".

The libraries of Timbuktu were established in the fourteenth century and attracted scholars from all over the world.

Functions
Libraries may provide physical or digital access to material, and may be a physical location or a virtual space, or both. A library's collection can include books, periodicals, newspapers, manuscripts, films, maps, prints, documents, microform, CDs, cassettes, videotapes, DVDs, Blu-ray Discs, e-books, audiobooks, databases, table games, video games and other formats. Libraries range widely in size, up to millions of items.

Libraries often provide quiet areas for studying, and they also often offer common areas to facilitate group study and collaboration. Libraries often provide public facilities for access to their electronic resources and the Internet. Public and institutional collections and services may be intended for use by people who choose not to—or cannot afford to—purchase an extensive collection themselves, who need material no individual can reasonably be expected to have, or who require professional assistance with their research.

Services offered by a library are variously described as library services, information services, or the combination "library and information services", although different institutions and sources define such terminology differently. Organizations or departments are often called by one of these names.

Organization 

Most libraries have materials arranged in a specified order according to a library classification system, so that items may be located quickly and collections may be browsed efficiently. Some libraries have additional galleries beyond the public ones, where reference materials are stored. These reference stacks may be open to selected members of the public. Others require patrons to submit a "stack request", which is a request for an assistant to retrieve the material from the closed stacks: see List of closed stack libraries.

Larger libraries are often divided into departments staffed by both paraprofessionals and professional librarians.
 Circulation (or Access Services) – Handles user accounts and the loaning/returning and shelving of materials.
 Collection Development – Orders materials and maintains materials budgets.
 Reference – Staffs a reference desk answering questions from users (using structured reference interviews), instructing users, and developing library programming. Reference may be further broken down by user groups or materials; common collections are children's literature, young adult literature, and genealogy materials.
 Electronic Library - Responsible for providing information to users via electronic means
 Technical Services – Works behind the scenes cataloging and processing new materials and deaccessioning weeded materials.
 Stacks Maintenance – Re-shelves materials that have been returned to the library after patron use and shelves materials that have been processed by Technical Services. Stacks Maintenance also shelf reads the material in the stacks to ensure that it is in the correct library classification order.
Basic tasks in library management include the planning of acquisitions (which materials the library should acquire, by purchase or otherwise), library classification of acquired materials, preservation of materials (especially rare and fragile archival materials such as manuscripts), the deaccessioning of materials, patron borrowing of materials, and developing and administering library computer systems. More long-term issues include the planning of the construction of new libraries or extensions to existing ones, and the development and implementation of outreach services and reading-enhancement services (such as adult literacy and children's programming). Library materials like books, magazines, periodicals, CDs, etc. are managed by Dewey Decimal Classification Theory and modified Dewey Decimal Classification Theory is more practical reliable system for library materials management.

The International Organization for Standardization (ISO) has published several standards regarding the management of libraries through its Technical Committee 46 (TC 46), which is focused on "libraries, documentation and information centers, publishing, archives, records management, museum documentation, indexing and abstracting services, and information science". The following is a partial list of some of them:
 ISO 2789:2006 Information and documentation—International library statistics
 ISO 11620:1998 Information and documentation—Library performance indicators
 ISO 11799:2003 Information and documentation—Document storage requirements for archive and library materials
 ISO 14416:2003 Information and documentation—Requirements for binding of books, periodicals, serials, and other paper documents for archive and library use—Methods and materials
 ISO/TR 20983:2003 Information and documentation—Performance indicators for electronic library services

Usage 

Some patrons may not know how to fully use the library's resources. This can be due to individuals' unease in approaching a staff member. Ways in which a library's content is displayed or accessed may have the most impact on use. An antiquated or clumsy search system, or staff unwilling or untrained to engage their patrons, will limit a library's usefulness. In the public libraries of the United States, beginning in the 19th century, these problems drove the emergence of the library instruction movement, which advocated library user education. One of the early leaders was John Cotton Dana. The basic form of library instruction is sometimes known as information literacy.

Libraries should inform their users of what materials are available in their collections and how to access that information. Before the computer age, this was accomplished by the card catalogue—a cabinet (or multiple cabinets) containing many drawers filled with index cards that identified books and other materials. In a large library, the card catalogue often filled a large room.

The emergence of the Internet, however, has led to the adoption of electronic catalogue databases (often referred to as "webcats" or as online public access catalogues, OPACs), which allow users to search the library's holdings from any location with Internet access. This style of catalogue maintenance is compatible with new types of libraries, such as digital libraries and distributed libraries, as well as older libraries that have been retrofitted. Large libraries may be scattered within multiple buildings across a town, each having multiple floors, with multiple rooms housing their resources across a series of shelves called bays. Once a user has located a resource within the catalogue, they must then use navigational guidance to retrieve the resource physically, a process that may be assisted through signage, maps, GPS systems, or RFID tagging.

Finland has the highest number of registered book borrowers per capita in the world. Over half of Finland's population are registered borrowers. In the US, public library users have borrowed on average roughly 15 books per user per year from 1856 to 1978. From 1978 to 2004, book circulation per user declined approximately 50%. The growth of audiovisuals circulation, estimated at 25% of total circulation in 2004, accounts for about half of this decline.

Relationship with the Internet 

A library may make use of the Internet in a number of ways, from creating its own library website to making the contents of its catalogues searchable online. Some specialised search engines such as Google Scholar offer a way to facilitate searching for academic resources such as journal articles and research papers. The Online Computer Library Center allows anyone to search the world's largest repository of library records through its WorldCat online database. Websites such as LibraryThing and Amazon provide abstracts, reviews, and recommendations of books. Libraries provide computers and Internet access to allow people to search for information online. Online information access is particularly attractive to younger library users.

Digitization of books, particularly those that are out-of-print, in projects such as Google Books provides resources for library and other online users. Due to their holdings of valuable material, some libraries are important partners for search engines such as Google in realizing the potential of such projects and have received reciprocal benefits in cases where they have negotiated effectively. As the prominence of and reliance on the Internet has grown, library services have moved the emphasis from mainly providing print resources to providing more computers and more Internet access. Libraries face a number of challenges in adapting to new ways of information seeking that may stress convenience over quality, reducing the priority of information literacy skills. The potential decline in library usage, particularly reference services, puts the necessity for these services in doubt.

Library scholars have acknowledged that libraries need to address the ways that they market their services if they are to compete with the Internet and mitigate the risk of losing users. This includes promoting the information literacy skills training considered vital across the library profession. Many US based research librarians rely on the ACRL Framework for Information Literacy in order to guide students and faculty in research. However, marketing of services has to be adequately supported financially in order to be successful. This can be problematic for library services that are publicly funded and find it difficult to justify diverting tight funds to apparently peripheral areas such as branding and marketing.

The privacy aspect of library usage in the Internet age is a matter of growing concern and advocacy; privacy workshops are run by the Library Freedom Project which teach librarians about digital tools (such as the Tor network) to thwart mass surveillance.

Librarians

Libraries are usually staffed by a combination of professionally-trained librarians, paraprofessional staff sometimes called library technicians, and support staff. Some topics related to the education of librarians and allied staff include accessibility of the collection, acquisition of materials, arrangement and finding tools, the book trade, the influence of the physical properties of the different writing materials, language distribution, role in education, rates of literacy, budgets, staffing, libraries for specially targeted audiences, architectural merit, patterns of usage, the role of libraries in a nation's cultural heritage, and the role of government, church or private sponsorship. Since the 1960s, issues of computerization and digitization have arisen.

Types
Many institutions make a distinction between a circulating or lending library, where materials are expected and intended to be loaned to patrons, institutions, or other libraries, and a reference library where material is not lent out. Travelling libraries, such as the early horseback libraries of eastern Kentucky and bookmobiles, are generally of the lending type. Modern libraries are often a mixture of both, containing a general collection for circulation, and a reference collection which is restricted to the library premises. Also, increasingly, digital collections enable broader access to material that may not circulate in print, and enables libraries to expand their collections even without building a larger facility. Lamba (2019) reinforced this idea by observing that "today's libraries have become increasingly multi-disciplinary, collaborative and networked" and that applying Web 2.0 tools to libraries would "not only connect the users with their community and enhance communication but will also help the librarians to promote their library's activities, services, and products to target both their actual and potential users".

Academic libraries

Academic libraries are generally located on college and university campuses and primarily serve the students and faculty of that and other academic institutions. Some academic libraries, especially those at public institutions, are accessible to members of the general public in whole or in part. Library services are sometimes extended to the general public at a fee, some academic libraries create such services in order to enhance literacy levels in their communities.

Academic libraries are libraries that are hosted in post-secondary educational institutions, such as colleges and universities. Their main functions are to provide support in research, consultancy and resource linkage for students and faculty of the educational institution. Academic libraries house current, reliable and relevant information resources spread through all the disciplines which serve to assuage the information requirements of students and faculty. In cases where not all books are housed some libraries have E-resources, where they subscribe for a given institution they are serving, in order to provide backups and additional information that is not practical to have available as hard copies. Furthermore, most libraries collaborate with other libraries in exchange of books.

Specific course-related resources are usually provided by the library, such as copies of textbooks and article readings held on 'reserve' (meaning that they are loaned out only on a short-term basis, usually a matter of hours). Some academic libraries provide resources not usually associated with libraries, such as the ability to check out laptop computers, web cameras, or scientific calculators.

Academic libraries offer workshops and courses outside of formal, graded coursework, which are meant to provide students with the tools necessary to succeed in their programs. These workshops may include help with citations, effective search techniques, journal databases, and electronic citation software. These workshops provide students with skills that can help them achieve success in their academic careers (and often, in their future occupations), which they may not learn inside the classroom.

The academic library provides a quiet study space for students on campus; it may also provide group study space, such as meeting rooms. In North America, Europe, and other parts of the world, academic libraries are becoming increasingly digitally oriented. The library provides a "gateway" for students and researchers to access various resources, both print/physical and digital. Academic institutions are subscribing to electronic journals databases, providing research and scholarly writing software, and usually provide computer workstations or computer labs for students to access journals, library search databases and portals, institutional electronic resources, Internet access, and course- or task-related software (i.e. word processing and spreadsheet software). Some academic libraries take on new roles, for instance, acting as an electronic repository for institutional scholarly research and academic knowledge, such as the collection and curation of digital copies of students' theses and dissertations. Moreover, academic libraries are increasingly acting as publishers on their own on a not-for-profit basis, especially in the form of fully Open Access institutional publishers.

Children's libraries

Children's libraries are special collections of books intended for juvenile readers and usually kept in separate rooms of general public libraries. Some children's libraries have entire floors or wings dedicated to them in bigger libraries while smaller ones may have a separate room or area for children. They are an educational agency seeking to acquaint the young with the world's literature and to cultivate a love for reading. Their work supplements that of the public schools.

Services commonly provided by public libraries may include storytelling sessions for infants, toddlers, preschool children, or after-school programs, all with an intention of developing early literacy skills and a love of books. One of the most popular programs offered in public libraries are summer reading programs for children, families, and adults.

Another popular reading program for children is PAWS TO READ or similar programs where children can read to certified therapy dogs. Since animals are a calming influence and there is no judgment, children learn confidence and a love of reading. Many states have these types of programs: parents need simply ask their librarian to see if it is available at their local library.

National libraries

A national or state library serves as a national repository of information, and has the right of legal deposit, which is a legal requirement that publishers in the country need to deposit a copy of each publication with the library. Unlike a public library, a national library rarely allows citizens to borrow books. Often, their collections include numerous rare, valuable, or significant works. There are wider definitions of a national library, putting less emphasis on the repository character. The first national libraries had their origins in the royal collections of the sovereign or some other supreme body of the state.

Many national libraries cooperate within the National Libraries Section of the International Federation of Library Associations and Institutions (IFLA) to discuss their common tasks, define and promote common standards, and carry out projects helping them to fulfill their duties. The national libraries of Europe participate in The European Library which is a service of the Conference of European National Librarians (CENL).

Public lending libraries

A public library provides services to the general public. If the library is part of a countywide library system, citizens with an active library card from around that county can use the library branches associated with the library system. A library can serve only their city, however, if they are not a member of the county public library system. Much of the materials located within a public library are available for borrowing. The library staff decides upon the number of items patrons are allowed to borrow, as well as the details of borrowing time allotted. Typically, libraries issue library cards to community members wishing to borrow books. Often visitors to a city are able to obtain a public library card.

Many public libraries also serve as community organizations that provide free services and events to the public, such as reading groups and toddler story time. For many communities, the library is a source of connection to a vast world, obtainable knowledge and understanding, and entertainment. According to a study by the Pennsylvania Library Association, public library services play a major role in fighting rising illiteracy rates among youths. Public libraries are protected and funded by the public they serve.

As the number of books in libraries have steadily increased since their inception, the need for compact storage and access with adequate lighting has grown. The stack system involves keeping a library's collection of books in a space separate from the reading room. This arrangement arose in the 19th century. Book stacks quickly evolved into a fairly standard form in which the cast iron and steel frameworks supporting the bookshelves also supported the floors, which often were built of translucent blocks to permit the passage of light (but were not transparent, for reasons of modesty). The introduction of electric lights had a huge impact on lighting in libraries. The use of glass floors was largely discontinued, though floors were still often composed of metal grating to allow air to circulate in multi-story stacks. As more space was needed, a method of moving shelves on tracks (compact shelving) was introduced to cut down on otherwise wasted aisle space.

Library 2.0, a term coined in 2005, is the library's response to the challenge of Google and an attempt to meet the changing needs of users by using Web 2.0 technology. Some of the aspects of Library 2.0 include, commenting, tagging, bookmarking, discussions, use of online social networks by libraries, plug-ins, and widgets. Inspired by Web 2.0, it is an attempt to make the library a more user-driven institution.

Despite the importance ascribed to public libraries, their budgets are often cut by legislatures. In some cases, funding has dwindled so much that libraries have been forced to cut their hours and release employees.

Reference libraries

A reference library does not lend books and other items; instead, they can only be read at the library itself. Typically, such libraries are used for research purposes, for example at a university. Some items at reference libraries may be historical and even unique. Many lending libraries contain a "reference section", which holds books, such as dictionaries, which are common reference books, and are therefore not lent out. Such reference sections may be referred to as "reading rooms", which may also include newspapers and periodicals. An example of a reading room is the Hazel H. Ransom Reading Room at the Harry Ransom Center of the University of Texas at Austin, which maintains the papers of literary agent Audrey Wood.

Research libraries

A research library is a collection of materials on one or more subjects. A research library supports scholarly or scientific research and will generally include primary as well as secondary sources; it will maintain permanent collections and attempt to provide access to all necessary materials. A research library is most often an academic or national library, but a large special library may have a research library within its special field, and a very few of the largest public libraries also serve as research libraries. A large university library may be considered a research library; and in North America, such libraries may belong to the Association of Research Libraries. In the United Kingdom, they may be members of Research Libraries UK (RLUK).

A research library can be either a reference library, which does not lend its holdings, or a lending library, which does lend all or some of its holdings. Some extremely large or traditional research libraries are entirely reference in this sense, lending none of their materials; most academic research libraries, at least in the US and the UK, now lend books, but not periodicals or other materials. Many research libraries are attached to a parental organization and serve only members of that organization. Examples of research libraries include the British Library, the Bodleian Library at Oxford University and the New York Public Library Main Branch on 42nd Street in Manhattan, State Public Scientific Technological Library of the Siberian Branch of the Russian Academy of Science.

Digital libraries

Digital libraries are libraries that house digital resources. They are defined as an organization and not a service that provide access to digital works, have a preservation responsibility to provide future access to materials, and provides these items easily and affordably. The definition of a digital library implies that "a digital library uses a variety of software, networking technologies and standards to facilitate access to digital content and data to a designated user community." Access to digital libraries can be influenced by several factors, either individually or together. The most common factors that influence access are: The library's content, the characteristics and information needs of the target users, the library's digital interface, the goals and objectives of the library's organizational structure, and the standards and regulations that govern library use. Access will depend on the users ability to discover and retrieve documents that interest them and that they require, which in turn is a preservation question. Digital objects cannot be preserved passively, they must be curated by digital librarians to ensure the trust and integrity of the digital objects.

One of the biggest considerations for digital librarians is the need to provide long-term access to their resources; to do this, there are two issues requiring watchfulness: Media failure and format obsolescence. With media failure, a particular digital item is unusable because of some sort of error or problem. A scratched CD-ROM, for example, will not display its contents correctly, but another, unscratched disk will not have that problem. Format obsolescence is when a digital format has been superseded by newer technology, and so items in the old format are unreadable and unusable. Dealing with media failure is a reactive process, because something is done only when a problem presents itself. In contrast, format obsolescence is preparatory, because changes are anticipated and solutions are sought before there is a problem.

Future trends in digital preservation include: Transparent enterprise models for digital preservation, launch of self-preserving objects, increased flexibility in digital preservation architectures, clearly defined metrics for comparing preservation tools, and terminology and standards interoperability in real time.

Special libraries

Many private businesses and public organizations, including hospitals, churches, museums, research laboratories, law firms, and many government departments and agencies, maintain their own libraries for the use of their employees in doing specialized research related to their work. Depending on the particular institution, special libraries may or may not be accessible to the general public or elements thereof. In more specialized institutions such as law firms and research laboratories, librarians employed in special libraries are commonly specialists in the institution's field rather than generally trained librarians, and often are not required to have advanced degrees in a specifically library-related field due to the specialized content and clientele of the library.

Special libraries can also include women's libraries or LGBTQ libraries, which serve the needs of women and the LGBTQ community. Libraries and the LGBTQ community have an extensive history, and there are currently many libraries, archives, and special collections devoted to preserving and helping the LGBTQ community. Women's libraries, such as the Vancouver Women's Library or the Women's Library @LSE are examples of women's libraries that offer services to women and girls and focus on women's history.

Some special libraries, such as governmental law libraries, hospital libraries, and military base libraries commonly are open to public visitors to the institution in question. Depending on the particular library and the clientele it serves, special libraries may offer services similar to research, reference, public, academic, or children's libraries, often with restrictions such as only lending books to patients at a hospital or restricting the public from parts of a military collection. Given the highly individual nature of special libraries, visitors to a special library are often advised to check what services and restrictions apply at that particular library.

Special libraries are distinguished from special collections, which are branches or parts of a library intended for rare books, manuscripts, and other special materials, though some special libraries have special collections of their own, typically related to the library's specialized subject area.

For more information on specific types of special libraries, see law libraries, medical libraries, music libraries, or transportation libraries.

Digital libraries

In the 21st century, there has been increasing use of the Internet to gather and retrieve data. The shift to digital libraries has greatly impacted the way people use physical libraries. Between 2002 and 2004, the average American academic library saw the overall number of transactions decline approximately 2.2%. Libraries are trying to keep up with the digital world and the new generation of students that are used to having information just one click away. For example, the University of California Library System saw a 54% decline in circulation between 1991 and 2001 of 8,377,000 books to 3,832,000.

These facts might be a consequence of the increased availability of e-resources. In 1999–2000, 105 ARL university libraries spent almost $100 million on electronic resources, which is an increase of nearly $23 million from the previous year. A 2003 report by the Open E-book Forum found that close to a million e-books had been sold in 2002, generating nearly $8 million in revenue. Another example of the shift to digital libraries can be seen in Cushing Academy's decision to dispense with its library of printed books—more than 20,000 volumes in all—and switch over entirely to digital media resources.

A 2001 discussion paper exploring changing use of libraries reported decreased library usage by undergraduate students, who had become more used to retrieving information from the Internet than a traditional library. Finding information by simply searching the Internet is seen as easier and faster than reading an entire book. In a survey conducted by NetLibrary, 93% of undergraduate students said that finding information online made more sense to them than going to the library. Three-quarters said they did not have enough time to go to the library. While the retrieving information from the Internet may be efficient and time-saving than visiting a traditional library, research showed that undergraduates are most likely searching only .03% of the entire web.

In the mid-2000s, Swedish company Distec invented a library book vending machine known as the GoLibrary, that offers library books to people where there is no branch, limited hours, or high traffic locations such as El Cerrito del Norte BART station in California.

Associations 

The International Federation of Library Associations and Institutions (IFLA) is the leading international association of library organizations. It is the global voice of the library and information profession, and its annual conference provides a venue for librarians to learn from one another.

Library associations in Asia include the Indian Library Association (ILA), Indian Association of Special Libraries and Information Centers (IASLIC), Bengal Library Association (BLA), Kolkata, Pakistan Library Association, the Pakistan Librarians Welfare Organization, the Bangladesh Association of Librarians, Information Scientists and Documentalists, the Library Association of Bangladesh, and the Sri Lanka Library Association (founded 1960).

National associations of the English-speaking world include the American Library Association, the Australian Library and Information Association, the Canadian Library Association, the Library and Information Association of New Zealand Aotearoa, and the Research Libraries UK (a consortium of 30 university and other research libraries in the United Kingdom). Library bodies such as CILIP (formerly the Library Association, founded 1877) may advocate the role that libraries and librarians can play in a modern Internet environment, and in the teaching of information literacy skills. The Nigerian Library Association is the recognized group for librarians working in Nigeria. It was established in 1962 in Ibadan.

Public library advocacy is support given to a public library for its financial and philosophical goals or needs. Most often this takes the form of monetary or material donations or campaigning to the institutions which oversee the library, sometimes by advocacy groups such as Friends of Libraries and community members. Originally, library advocacy was centered on the library itself, but current trends show libraries positioning themselves to demonstrate they provide "economic value to the community" in means that are not directly related to the checking out of books and other media.

Protection
Libraries are considered part of the cultural heritage and are one of the primary objectives in many state and domestic conflicts and are at risk of destruction and looting. Financing is often carried out by robbing valuable library items. National and international coordination regarding military and civil structures for the protection of libraries is operated by Blue Shield International and UNESCO. From an international perspective, despite the partial dissolution of state structures and very unclear security situations as a result of the wars and unrest, robust undertakings to protect libraries are being carried out. The topic is also the creation of "no-strike lists", in which the coordinates of important cultural monuments such as libraries have been preserved.

See also

 Document management system
 Libraries in fiction
 Library anxiety
 Library portal
 Trends in library usage
 List of libraries

References

Further reading

 Barnard, T.D.F. (ed.) (1967). Library Buildings: design and fulfilment; papers read at the Week-end Conference of the London and Home Counties Branch of the Library Association, held at Hastings, 21–23 April 1967. London: Library Association (London and Home Counties Branch)
 Belanger, Terry. Lunacy & the Arrangement of Books, New Castle, Del.: Oak Knoll Books, 1983; 3rd ptg 2003, 
 Bieri, Susanne & Fuchs, Walther (2001). Bibliotheken bauen: Tradition und Vision = Building for Books: traditions and visions. Basel: Birkhäuser 
Buschman, John.(2022). “Of Architects and Libraries: A Simple Discourse Analysis.” The Library Quarterly (Chicago) 92.3: 296–310.
 Copeland, Andrea J. (2015) Libraries , International Encyclopedia of the Social & Behavioral Sciences (Second Edition). 
 Ellsworth, Ralph E. (1973). Academic Library Buildings: a guide to architectural issues and solutions. 530 pp. Boulder: Associated University Press
 Fraley, Ruth A. & Anderson, Carol Lee (1985). Library Space Planning: how to assess, allocate, and reorganize collections, resources, and physical facilities. New York: Neal-Schuman Publishers 
 
 Irwin, Raymond (1947). The National Library Service [of the United Kingdom]. London: Grafton & Co. x, 96 p.
 Lewanski, Richard C. (1967). Library Directories [and] Library Science Dictionaries, in Bibliography and Reference Series, no. 4. 1967 ed. Santa Barbara, Calif.: Clio Press. N.B.: Publisher also named as the "American Bibliographical Center".
 Robert K. Logan with Marshall McLuhan. The Future of the Library: From Electric Media to Digital Media. New York: Peter Lang Publishing.
 Mason, Ellsworth (1980). Mason on Library Buildings. Metuchen, NJ: Scarecrow Press 
 Monypenny, Phillip, and Guy Garrison (1966). The Library Functions of the States [i.e. the US]: Commentary on the Survey of Library Functions of the States, [under the auspices of the] Survey and Standard Committee [of the] American Association of State Libraries. Chicago: American Library Association. xiii, 178 p.
 
 Orr, J.M. (1975). Designing Library Buildings for Activity; 2nd ed. London: Andre Deutsch 
 
 Thompson, Godfrey (1973). Planning and Design of Library Buildings''. London: Architectural Press

External links
 
 LIBweb—Directory of library servers in 146 countries via WWW
 Centre for the History of the Book, hss.ed.ac.uk
 Libraries: Frequently Asked Questions, ibiblio.org

 
Library science
Book promotion